The Special Task and Rescue (Jawi: ڤاسوكن تيندقن خاص دان ڤڽلامت ماريتيم) or STAR is the maritime tactical unit of the Malaysian Maritime Enforcement Agency (MMEA; internationally known as Malaysia Coast Guard) established to protect the local maritime assets of Malaysia.

The mission and responsibility of this unit include the commencement of rescue mission in a difficult underwater situation, rescuing accident victims at sea, and searching ships tactically in the event this is required. In addition, the STAR also share the role of the rapid reaction force together with the Royal Malaysian Navy (RMN) PASKAL and Royal Malaysian Police (RMP) UNGERIN on piracy, terrorism and robbery threats at sea before the arrival of RMP's Marine Operations Force, MMEA and RMN reinforcements.

History 

Established in April 2005, a handful of Royal Malaysian Air Force (RMAF) PASKAU and RMN PASKAL commandos are transferred into the MMEA to make up the first STAR team. The concept of MMEA Special Operations is based on the United States Coast Guard (USCG) Maritime Safety and Security Team (MSST) and Maritime Security Response Team (MSRT).

In April 2008, twenty-five home-grown trainees successfully completed the MMEA Basic Commando Course Orientation held at Pulau Indah, Selangor. This included one senior commissioned officer, three senior non-commissioned officers (SNCO), and one non-commissioned officer (NCO). Trainees attending this course were selected from a STAR team selection test which was held from 19 to 24 December 2007.

In July 2009, 24 trainees manage to pass the RMAF Basic Commando Course and thus forming pioneer team of home-grown STAR operators. According to Deputy Director Chief of Malaysian Maritime Operations VAdm. (M) Dato' Noor Aziz Yunnan, the team needed an additional 200 members by the end of the year.

National Special Operations Force 

In 2016, main counter-terrorism operators in Malaysia are formed into one special operations task force. Few operators from the STAR was selected to be part of the National Special Operations Force (NSOF). The NSOF was disbanded in October 2018.

Roles, responsibilities and capabilities

 Maritime interdiction and law enforcement
 Force protection
 CBRN-E (chemical, biological, radiological or nuclear) detection
 Search and Rescue (limited)
 Port Protection/Anti-sabotage
 Underwater Port Security
 Canine Handling Teams (explosive detection)
 Tactical Boat Operations
 Non-Permissive Boarding capability
 Counter-Terrorism
 Vertical Insertion (fast roping)
 Hook and Climb

Structure 
Each STAR team has 25 operators. The STAR teams are spread throughout all Maritime Districts (MD) in the country.

Uniforms and insignia 

Red Beret

STAR operators wear the scarlet red beret to differ them from other Malaysian Special Operation Forces. STAR beret using same red that has in MMEA logo. Before using the current colour, STAR operators use the 'Midnight express' colour beret .

STAR Insignia

As a maritime tactical unit, the STAR gets its influence from the RMN PASKAL. All STAR operators wear the golden STAR Insignia above theirs left breast pocket, in similar ways as the PASKAL's Trimedia (the RMN's version of U.S. Navy SEALs 'Trident' insignia).

The various components symbolise:

 Wing – the traditional symbol for airborne capability
 Rope and Anchor – the traditional symbol for a naval unit
 Two Bugis Badik – Represent skilful sailor and fighter
 Five-pointed Star – Symbolised 'STAR' which an acronym for the 'Special Task And Rescue'

Shoulder Flash

STAR operators wear a 'STAR' tab on the right shoulder of their uniform.

Camouflage

The STAR team use U.S. Army Universal Camouflage Pattern for their Battle Dress Uniform (BDU). STAR is the first unit ever to use digital camouflage in Malaysia which is since 2009.

Selection and training

Each prospective trainee needs to pass five stages of training and courses before been bestowed with the STAR Scarlet Red Beret and STAR Insignia.

Preparatory Course (4 weeks) 

Lasts for one month, in the year 2011, this preparatory course was held in the RMAF Kuala Lumpur Airbase and has been overseen by instructors from PASKAU and STAR. It is a standard orientation among Malaysian Armed Forces (MAF) Special Forces to weed out the weak and unprepared candidates before proceeding to the next stage of training. It follows the standards set up by MAF Special Forces (PASKAU, PASKAL, 21 GGK).

In the present day, the STAR runs their own orientation training at MMEA's Base, Station and Academy. Overseen by veteran STAR instructors, the training is now known as Kursus Pra Asas Komando STAR ('STAR Pre-Basic Commando Course').

During the orientation course implementation, each candidate had to pass three tests which are:
 Test 1 – Physical Test (Water)
 Test 2 – Physical Test (Land)
 Final Test – Fitness Test
 The fitness test consist of  run under 30 minutes,  freestyle swimming under 10 minutes,  sidestroke swimming under 12 minutes, and  mixstyle swimming under 12 minutes.

Pre-Basic Commando Course (2 weeks) 

The objective of this course is to expose and prepare candidates before sending them to the Basic Commando Course held within the three branches of the MAF. This course lasts for two weeks in Teluk Batik, Lumut, Perak and overseen by instructors from PASKAL and STAR.

During this course, trainees will be taught how to build up mental and physical strength and the esprit de corps for the upcoming Basic Commando Course. Trainees also exposed with basic small arms operation, map reading, compass and protractor reading, basic unarmed combat, swimming, long-distance running, navigation, survival effort, and basic marksman training. Training also included first aid, interrogation resistance, and amphibious assault.

Intensive Training (3 weeks) 

This three weeks training is especially to waterborne special forces such as STAR and PASKAL. Trainees who pass the Pre-Basic Commando Course will be trained in the physical aspect of land and water. This training is the final selection process before trainees sent to the Basic Commando Course.

Trainees need to pass two fitness test and one 'drown-proofing' test:
 Fitness Test (Land)
  run under 34 minutes, 50 push-ups under 90 seconds. 50 sit-ups under 90 seconds,  rope climbing etc.
 Fitness Test (Water)
  freestyle swimming under 10 minutes,  sidestroke swimming under 12 minutes and  mixstyle swimming under 12 minutes,  dive to pool bottom,  dive across pool and diving from  platform.
 'Drown-proofing' Test
  swim across, 15 minutes float and  dive to pool bottom; all with arms and legs tied.

Basic Commando Course (12 weeks) 

Lasts for 12 weeks, STAR candidate will be sent to either RMN Basic Commando Course at RMN Naval Base in Lumut, Perak or RMAF Basic Commando Course at RMAF Regiment Jugra, Selangor. Both RMN and RMAF Commando School is nearby to MMEA Station in Lumut (MD3) and Port Klang (MD4).

In Basic Commando Course, trainees will get through five phases which is:
 Phase 1 – Camp Phase (5 weeks)
 Phase 2 – Jungle Phase (2 weeks)
 Phase 3 – Swamp Phase and Long Range March (1 week)
 Phase 4 – Sea Phase (2 weeks)
 Phase 5 – Escape and Evasion (E&E) (2 weeks)

After graduation, trainees will be bestowed with berets according to the commando school they have entered. Either Maya blue beret for RMAF Commando School, or Magenta beret for RMN Commando School. At this point, the trainees are considered as an unofficial member of the STAR Team.

Special Task Introduction Course (6 weeks) 

Once finished the 12 weeks Basic Commando Course, each trainee needs to complete a six weeks Kursus Pengenalan Tindakan Khas ('Special Task Introduction Course') held by the MMEA. During the course, trainees will be exposed to weapon handling, tower training, helicopter-borne training, land and water navigation, survivability and other special operations skills.

In the closing ceremony, trainees will be bestowed with the red beret and STAR's insignia as a symbol that they are officially accepted into the elite unit.

Advanced training 

As a special operations force, the STAR operators will be sent to advance training held by the Malaysian Army and Royal Malaysian Navy (RMN) training centre.

On 14 November 2009, 25 operators from the STAR team took part in joint training exercises with 11 operators from PASKAL Alpha Team. They trained in close quarters combat and ship boarding and rescue, on board the KD Panglima Hitam, at the RMN Naval Base in Lumut Perak. These exercises were conducted to test whether STAR members were able to perform their duties and responsibilities. The training also involved Maritime Ship and boat assets such as KM Gagah vessels and two Kilat boat classes from the Lumut Maritime District (MD3).

Equipment

Operations

MT Tanker MGT1 hijacking 
7 September 2017 - A plan by 13 Indonesian pirates to rob and hijack Thai-registered oil tanker was foiled by a STAR team from the Malaysian Maritime Enforcement Agency (MMEA), near Tenggol Island. The ship, MT Tanker MGT1, had 14 crew members, all of them is Siamese, carried around 2.2 million litres of diesel with an estimated value of 7 million ringgit (1.66 million US dollars) when it disappeared from the Automatic Identification System (AIS) on Wednesday afternoon. It was on its way from Thailand to deliver fuel to Johor. The MMEA received a report from a local fisherman who spotted the pirates on a smaller boat boarding the Thai vessel – MT Tanker MGT1 – about three nautical miles from Yu Besar Island. STAR team was deployed to launch a rescue mission. The team departed for the tanker's last known location via helicopter but when they arrived, found the tanker missing. A team stormed the tanker, off the coast of Terengganu and arrested 10 pirates. Following the arrest of the pirates and their subsequent interrogation, Malaysian authorities arrested the mastermind, an Indonesian in his 50s, at a hotel in Johor Bahru at noon.

MT Lee Bo robbery 
1 June 2018 - 14 pirates were arrested aboard MT Bright by a STAR team, 25 nautical miles off the coast of Mersing within Malaysian waters during a pre-dawn raid. Before the arrest, command centre reported that the pirates were robbing a Mongolian-registered merchant vessel, MT Lee Bo, and took all the crew's personal items but failed to rob the cargo as the ship was empty. Following this, KM Sebatik ship was tasked to trail Lee Bo and gather more information on the pirates. Upon reaching the ship, Sebatik crew found 12 ship crews on board the ship and the vital information that the pirates were using machetes as a weapon and their last seen position. Information was relayed to the command centre, and a team of seven STAR members were scrambled using AW139 helicopters to track the pirates. The pirates' ship was identified as MT Bright, and the STAR team rappelled down from their helicopter and arrested all 14 on board. During interrogation, details on the mastermind were spilt by the pirates, and MMEA strategic partner, the Indonesian Western Fleet Quick Response - Angkatan Laut (WFQR-AL) were alerted and they managed to arrest two masterminds at Batam, Indonesia.

In popular culture
Film & television
 Coast Guard The Movie: Operasi Helang (Operation Eagle), a 2023 action film starring by Saharul Ridzwan. The protagonist is an officer of STAR Team.
 TQ Captain, a 2017 television series where aired in Astro Ria.
Documentary
 999 (Malaysian TV series).
 Ops Maritim (2017) is a about routine life of MMEA and STAR Team.
 Malaysia Hari Ini.

See also 
 Elite Forces of Malaysia
 Malaysian Army 21st Grup Gerak Khas
 Malaysian Army 10th Parachute Brigade
 Royal Malaysian Navy PASKAL
 Royal Malaysian Air Force PASKAU
 Royal Malaysia Police Pasukan Gerakan Khas

References

20.https://www.nst.com.my/lifestyle/groove/2023/01/871184/showbiz-actor-saharul-ridzwan-beats-fear-deep-sea-spending-hour

21.https://www.kosmo.com.my/2023/01/19/sejam-terapung-tengah-laut-pengalaman-paling-mahal-saharul-ridzwan/

External links

 Malaysian Maritime Enforcement Agency

Law enforcement units
Law enforcement in Malaysia
Organizations established in 2005
Maritime safety
Counterterrorism in Malaysia
Malaysian Maritime Enforcement Agency
Special forces of Malaysia
Non-military counterterrorist organizations